Hougang United Football Club is a professional football club based in Hougang, Singapore. The club competes in the Singapore Premier League, the top tier of Singaporean football. Founded in 1998 as Marine Castle United, the club changed its name to Hougang United in 2011. Nicknamed the Cheetahs, It has played its home games at Hougang Stadium since its formation.

History

Foundation
Hougang United Football Club was founded as Marine Castle United Football Club, which was formed by Newcastle United fans in the Marine Parade area. Upon successful entry into the S.League in 1998, the club struggled in its early foray in the first few years, finishing in the bottom two for the next four seasons.

Marine Castle changed its name to Sengkang Marine Football Club in 2002 and finished in 8th position consecutively, its highest ever finish in its short history.

Financial difficulties then forced Sengkang Marine out of the S.League in 2004, and Paya Lebar-Punggol Football Club took its place in 2005, finishing the season as wooden-spoonist. The two clubs then merged their resources from 2006 to 2010 to form Sengkang Punggol Football Club, finishing no higher than 10th.

Renaming
On 1 January 2011, the chairman of Sengkang Punggol Football Club, Mr. Bill Ng, announced the changes that began the rewriting of another chapter of the football club. With improved financial status and a change in name to the present Hougang United Football Club, there was renewed optimism among the Hougang fan base around the club's home stadium since its inception, Hougang Stadium. The club also had its fair share of marquee players in the earlier days such as Michael Currie, who formerly played for Queens Park Rangers). Conversely, Grant Holt began his early career at the club, before going on to play for upper division clubs in England, such as Nottingham Forest and Norwich.

In November 2014, it was announced that Hougang United and Woodlands Wellington will merge for the 2015 season.

In 2019, Hougang United in a consolidation of home stadiums had to move out of Hougang Stadium to Jalan Besar Stadium. Just a year later however, Hougang United moved back to their home stadium, much to the delight of its home supporters.

First silverware
On 19 November 2022, Hougang United defeated defending champions Tampines Rovers 3–2 in the Singapore Cup final to win their inaugural Singapore Cup. It is their first ever silverware.

Ownership and finances

Partnership
On 22 November 2014, Hougang United announced a partnership with Global Football Academy for the 2015 S.League season.

On 16 November 2021, Hougang United announced the signing of main sponsorship with The Physio Circle for 3 years starting from 2022 to 2024.

On 19 October 2022, Hougang United announced the signing of sponsorship with Advance Capital Partners Pte Ltd for its women's team competing in the FAS Women's Premier League.

Scholarship
The Hougang United FC Scholarship was launched in May 2015. The aim of the scholarship is to support and facilitate the academic development of young non-professional footballing talents.

Supporters
The club uniquely has an enthusiastic supporters' club known as the Hougang HOOLS (Hougang Only One Love), which was set up in 2010. The fan group often organise an annual end of season friendly game against the players whom they sing for the entire season. The fan group's main objective is to collate everyone who supports Hougang United and grow them into a healthy fan community. The fan group also has an amateur band called Gate 3, who write songs about celebrating Hougang United.

Seasons

 2003 saw the introduction of penalty shoot-outs if a match ended in a draw in regular time. Winners of penalty shoot-outs gained two points instead of one.
 Sengkang Marine sat out the 2004 S.League season. They merged with Paya Lebar Punggol to form Sengkang Marine on their return to the S.League in 2006.
 Hougang United deducted 5-point for a pre-match brawl with Etoile during the 2011 season.

Continental record

Players

Current squad

 U23

U23

U23

 

U21
U21
U21
U21

On loan

 (to Young Lions)
 (National Service until 2023)
 (National Service until 2023)
 (National Service until 2025)
 (National Service until 2025, to Young Lions)

Technical staff

Managers

Manufacturers and sponsors

Honours
Cup
 Singapore Cup: Champion
 2022

References

External links
 Official Hougang United FC Website
 S.League website page on Hougang United FC
 Hougang United FC Facebook page
 Official Hougang United Twitter
 Official Hougang United Instagram

 
Football clubs in Singapore
Association football clubs established in 1998
1998 establishments in Singapore
Singapore Premier League clubs